Žvirgždaičiai is a small town in Marijampolė County, in southwestern Lithuania. According to the 2011 census, the town has a population of 242 people.

References

Towns in Lithuania
Towns in Marijampolė County
Šakiai District Municipality